The Wharfedale  MACH series of loudspeakers consists of the MACH 3, 5, 7, and 9.
This is an informational page devoted to owners and users of these loudspeakers and those interested in history and construction of electronic sound reproduction.

These loudspeakers were manufactured at Rank Hi-Fi, Wharfedale Works in West Yorkshire by Wharfedale Loudspeakers in England (UK).  They were featured in the Gramophone magazine in July 1982.
This range of high-efficiency (hi-fi) loudspeakers were released to replace their "E" Series of loudspeakers.  They were originally launched with prices from £200 to £430 per pair.  The drive units boasted a high sensitivity due to care in design and construction.  The tweeters (one per speaker) use horn-loaded compression.  The woofers and mids use lightweight fibre cones with ceramic magnets and ventilated aluminium coils.  The cabinets were made out of wood and were marketed for bass reflex.  The cabinets have modular front baffles made from styrofoam (polystyrene) with open-weave steel-mesh grilles.  Opaque clip-on grilles were also supplied and all the speakers have LED power displays and re-settable overload protection.  There are adjustable dials to control the midrange 100mm driver (tweeter on Mach 3 and mid on Machs 5, 7, and 9)

Specifications

Mach 3
1x25mm Treble: horn-loaded compression tweeter
1x200mm Bass Woofer lightweight fibre cone
Crossover frequency 5 kHz¿
Sensitivity: 94dB for 1 Watt at 1 metre
Enclosure volume: 30 Litres
Impedance: 8 Ohms
Power handling: 100 Watts
Recommended amplifier power rating: 10-100 Watts
Frequency range: 55 Hz to 22 kHz (DIN45500)
Frequency range (±3dB): 62 Hz to 17 kHz
Sensitivity: 94dB for 1 Watt at 1 metre (Anechoic)
Computer optimized bass loading

Mach 5
1x25mm Treble: horn-loaded compression tweeter
1x100mm Mid: lightweight fibre cone
1x200mm Bass: lightweight fibre cone woofer
Enclosure volume: 30 Litres
Impedance: 8 Ohms
Power handling: 125 Watts
Recommended amplifier power rating: 20-125 Watts
Frequency range: 55 Hz to 22 kHz (DIN45500)
Frequency range (±3dB): 62 Hz to 17 kHz
Sensitivity: 94dB for 1 Watt at 1 metre (Anechoic)
Computer optimized bass loading

Mach 7
1x25mm Treble: horn-loaded compression tweeter
1x100mm Mid: lightweight fibre cone
1x250mm Bass: lightweight fibre cone woofer
Enclosure volume: 50 Litres
Impedance: 8 Ohms
Power handling: 150 Watts
Recommended amplifier power rating: 20-150 Watts
Frequency range: 48 Hz to 22 kHz (DIN45500)
Frequency range (±3dB): 55 Hz to 17 kHz
Sensitivity: 94dB for 1 Watt at 1 metre (Anechoic)
Computer optimized bass loading

Mach 9
1x25mm Treble: horn-loaded compression tweeter
2x100mm Mid: lightweight fibre cone
1x250mm Bass: lightweight fibre cone woofer
Enclosure volume: 70 Litres
Impedance: 8 Ohms
Power handling: 200 Watts
Recommended amplifier power rating: 20-200 Watts
Frequency range: 43 Hz to 22 kHz (DIN45500)
Frequency range (±3dB): 50 Hz to 17 kHz
Sensitivity: 94dB for 1 Watt at 1 metre (Anechoic)
Computer optimized bass loading

Competitors
Some competing loudspeakers sold at the time were the Bose 901 Series IV and V, Bose 201 Series I, Bose Series 601 Series II, JBL Delta, Cerwin Vega D series, JBL Radiance, JBL Sigma, and Acoustic Research AR-58B.

See also
Quad Electroacoustics

References

Loudspeakers